China women's national goalball team is the women's national team of China. Goalball is a team sport designed specifically for athletes with vision impairment.  It takes part in international competitions.

Paralympic Games

2008 Beijing 

As the host nation, the team competed in the 2008 Summer Paralympics, from 6 to 17 September 2008, in the Beijing Institute of Technology Gymnasium 'bat wing' arena, Beijing, China.  There were 12 men's teams and 8 women's teams taking part in this event.  They took the silver medal.

2012 London 

The team competed in the 2012 Summer Paralympics from 30 August to 7 September 2012, in the Copper Box Arena, London, England.  The team came second.

Quarter-finals

Semi-finals

Finals

2016 Rio de Janeiro 

The team competed in the 2016 Summer Paralympics, with competition from Thursday, 8 September, to the finals on Friday, 16 September 2016, in the temporary Future Arena, Rio de Janeiro, Brazil.  The team came second.

Quarter-finals

Semi-finals

Finals

2020 Tokyo 

The team competed in the 2020 Summer Paralympics, with competition from Wednesday, 25 August, to the finals on Friday, 3 September 2021, in the Makuhari Messe arena, Chiba, Tokyo, Japan.

Round-robin

World championships

2010 Sheffield 

The team competed in the 2010 World Championships, from 20 to 25 June 2010, in Sheffield, England, in Pool Y.

2014 Espoo  

The team competed in the 2014 World Championships from 30 June to 5 July 2014, in Espoo, Finland.  They placed second in Pool Y, and lost to Russia in the quarter-finals, 1:4.

2018 Malmö 

The team competed in the 2018 World Championships from 3 to 8 June 2018, in Baltiska Hallen, Malmö, Sweden.  They placed sixth in Pool D, and tenth in the final standings.

Athletes included Zhenhua Cao, Wang Chunhua, Chunyan Wang, Xiling Zhang, and coach Zhang Xiaopeng.

IBSA World Games

2003 Quebec City  

The team competed in the 2003 IBSA World Games from 1 to 10 August 2011, in Quebec City, Canada.  Ten teams competed.  The first stage was pool play with five teams per pool and the top two teams in each pool advancing to the next round.

2015 Seoul  

The team competed in the 2015 IBSA World Games from 10 to 17 May 2015, in Seoul, South Korea.  They played in Group A with seven out of seven wins, against Denmark, Finland, Ghana, Greece, Israel, Spain, and Ukraine.  In the quarter-finals, they beat Japan 1:0, Australia 6:0, and in the finals were beaten by Israel 4:1, to take the silver medal.

Regional championships 

The team competed in  IBSA Asia goalball region, and from January 2010 became part of the IBSA Asia-Pacific goalball competition region.

2013 Beijing  

The team competed in the 2013 IBSA Asia Pacific Goalball Regional Championships, from 11 to 16 November 2013, in Beijing, China.  Of the four women's teams (Australia, China, Iran, Japan), China beat Japan 3:0, going into extra throws, to take the gold medal.

2015 Hangzhou  

The team competed in the 2015 IBSA Asia Pacific Goalball Regional Championships, from 8 to 12 November 2015, in the China National Goalball Training Centre, Hangzhou, China.  Of the five women's teams (Australia, China, Japan, Mongolia, Thailand), China lost to Japan 0:1 in the gold medal match.

2017 Bangkok  

The team competed in the 2017 IBSA Asia/Pacific Goalball Regional Championships, from Monday, 21, to Saturday, 26 August 2017, in the Thai-Japan Sports Stadium, Din Daeng, Bangkok, Thailand.  They lost to Japan 2:6 in the finals to take the silver medal.

2019 Chiba  

The team competed in the 2019 IBSA Goalball Asia-Pacific Regional Championships, from Thursday, 5, to Tuesday, 10 December 2019, in the Chiba Port Arena, Chiba, Japan. They beat South Korea in the semi-finals 9:1, but lost to Japan in the finals 1:2, to get the silver medal.

FESPIC Games 

In 2006, the team participated in the ninth and final FESPIC Games, held in Kuala Lumpur, Malaysia.  They were one of three teams competing, the other two being Iran and Japan.

Competitive history 

The table below contains individual game results for the team in international matches and competitions.

See also 

 Disabled sports
 China men's national goalball team
 China at the Paralympics

References

Goalball women's
National women's goalball teams
China at the Paralympics
Goalball in China
Goalball in Asia